Abu Suleiman Dawud Chaghri Beg ibn Mikail, widely known simply as Chaghri Beg (989–1060), Da'ud b. Mika'il b. Saljuq, also spelled Chaghri, was the co-ruler of the early Seljuk Empire. The name Chaghri is Turkic (Çağrı in modern Turkish) and literally means "small falcon", "merlin".

Background

Chaghri and his brother Tughril were the sons of Mikail and the grandsons of Seljuk. The Great Seljuk Empire was named after the latter, who was a Turkic clan leader either in Khazar or Oghuz states. In the early years of the 11th century, they left their former home and moved near the city of Jend (now a village) by the Syr Darya river, where they accepted the suzerainty of the Karakhanids in Transoxania (roughly modern Uzbekistan and southern Kazakhstan). After the defeat of the Karakhanids by Ghaznavids, they were able to gain independence.

Biography 

Very little is known of Chaghri and Tughril's lives until 1025. Both were raised by their grandfather Seljuk until they were fifteen and fought with Ali Tigin Bughra Khan, a minor Kara Khanid noble, against Mahmud of Ghazni. The earliest records of Chaghri concern his expeditions in Eastern Anatolia. Although a Ghaznavid governor chased him from his home in Jend to Anatolia, he was able to raid the Byzantine forts in Eastern Anatolia. However, according to Claude Cahen this was highly improbable and of legend.
From 1035 to 1037 Chaghri and Tughril  fought against Mas'ud I of Ghazni. Chaghri captured Merv (an important historical city now in Turkmenistan). Between 1038 and 1040 Chaghri fought against the Ghaznavids, usually with hit and run maneuvers and culminating in a major clash at the Battle of Dandanaqan. Tughril was rather hesitant and preferred continuing the hit-and-run attacks, but Chaghri commanded the Seljuk army and preferred direct confrontation. At Dandanaqan, the Seljuks defeated the numerically superior Gaznavid army. A kurultai was held after the battle, by which empire was divided between the two brothers. While Tughril reigned in the west (comprising modern western Iran, Azerbaijan and Iraq), Chaghri reigned in eastern Iran, Turkmenistan, and Afghanistan, a region collectively referred to as Greater Khorasan. Chaghri later also captured Balkh (in modern North Afghanistan). In 1048, he conquered Kerman in South Iran and, in 1056, the Sistan region (south east Iran). After the Seljuks had gained more influence over the Abbasid Caliphate, Chaghri married his daughter, Khadija Arslan Khatun, to the caliph Al-Qa'im in 1056.

Death
Chaghri died in Sarakhs, in North-eastern Iran. The historical sources do not agree on the exact date of his death: years 1059, 1060, 1061 and 1062 were proposed. But it is purported that numismatics can be used to determine the exact death date. Coins were minted in the name of Chaghri up to 1059 and in the name of his son Kavurt after 1060, so Chaghri's death can be ascribed more probably to 1059.

Daughters
One of his daughters was Gawhar Khatun. She was married to Erishgi (Erisghen). She was killed on the orders of her nephew Sultan Malik-Shah I in March–April 1075. Another daughter was married to Buyid Abu Mansur Fulad Sutun in 1047–8. Another daughter was Khadija Arslan Khatun. She had been betrothed to Zahir al-Din, son of Abbasid Caliph Al-Qa'im. However, Zahir al-Din died, and Arslan married Al-Qa'im in 1056. After Al-Qa'im's death in 1075, she married the Kakuyid Ali ibn Faramurz, with whom she had a son, Garshasp II. Another daughter was Safiya Khatun. She was married to Kurd Hazarasp ibn Bankir in 1069–70. After his death the same year, she married Uqaylid Sharaf al-Dawla Muslim, with whom, she had a son, Ali. After his death in 1085, she married his brother Ibrahim ibn Quraish.

Legacy 

Unlike later Ottoman practice, in earlier Turkic tradition, brothers usually participated in government affairs.(Bumin – İstemi in the 6th century, Bilge Khan – Kultegin in the 8th century are notable examples.)  Tughril and Chaghri as well as some other members of the family participated in the foundation of the empire. Although Tughril gained the title "sultan", it was Chaghri’s sons who continued it afterwards.

Chaghri had six sons and four daughters. Among his sons, Alp Arslan became the sultan of the Seljukid Empire in 1064. All the remaining members of the Great Seljuk Empire were from Chaghri’s lineage. (Except Seljuks of Rum who were the descendants of Chaghri's cousins.). Another son, Kavurt, became the governor of Kerman  (which later on became fully independent);  a third son, Yaquti, became the governor of Azerbaijan.

In popular culture 
In the 2021 Turkish TV series Alparslan: Büyük Selçuklu, he is portrayed by actor Erdinç Gülener.

References

Bibliography
 

989 births
1050s deaths
Seljuk rulers
Seljuk Empire
11th-century Turkic people